Fabian Ehmann (born 28 August 1998) is an Austrian professional footballer who plays as a goalkeeper for Austrian Football Bundesliga club TSV Hartberg.

Club career
He competed and advanced to Sturm Graz academies and joined the first team in 2016.

In the 2018–19 season, he played on loan at SV Kapfenberg in the 2. Liga.

On 24 June 2019, Ehmann joined Aris on a two-year deal. 
The 21-year-old Austrian goalkeeper participated in 11 2019–20 League games after Julián Cuesta received an injury. Unfortunately for Ehmann, he failed to take advantage of the opportunity presented to him, conceding 17 goals and only recording two clean sheets.

On 12 January 2021, Ehmann joined Danish 1st Division club Vendsyssel FF on a deal for the rest of the season.

On 30 June 2021 he returned to Austria and joined SV Horn on a two-year deal.

On 20 January 2023, Ehrmann signed with TSV Hartberg until the end of the 2022–23 season.

Career statistics

Club

References

External links
 

1998 births
Living people
Association football goalkeepers
Austrian footballers
Austrian expatriate footballers
Austria youth international footballers
Austria under-21 international footballers
2. Liga (Austria) players
Super League Greece players
Danish 1st Division players
SK Sturm Graz players
Kapfenberger SV players
Aris Thessaloniki F.C. players
Vendsyssel FF players
SV Horn players
TSV Hartberg players
Austrian expatriate sportspeople in Greece
Austrian expatriate sportspeople in Denmark
Expatriate footballers in Greece
Expatriate men's footballers in Denmark
Footballers from Graz